Stigmella zelkoviella is a moth of the family Nepticulidae. It is only known from Kyushu in Japan.

Adults are on wing from the end of April. There are probably two to three generations per year.

The larvae feed on Zelkova serrata. They mine the leaves of their host plant. The mine is linear, slender; highly contorted and pale brown. It includes brown granular frass in a longitudinal belt, which (in first half of the mine) occupies almost all width, but in last half of the mine becomes one third to one sixth of the width of the mine.

External links
Japanese Species Of The Genus Stigmella (Nepticulidae: Lepidoptera)

Nepticulidae
Moths of Japan
Moths described in 1985